The Magma Arizona Railroad  was built by the Magma Copper Company and operated from 1915 to 1997.

BHP purchased the Magma Copper Company and its lines in 1996 for A$3.2 billion and suspended rail operations on this line a year later.

The Magma was the last industrial short line railroad to use steam power, dieselizing on September 4, 1968.

Revival
The railroad has since changed hands and is currently owned by Resolution Copper, a joint venture of Rio Tinto and BHP. Discussions with representatives of Resolution indicate the Magma Arizona name will be kept if the mine and railroad are both reopened, which may occur after feasibility studies are completed in 2009.

Locomotives Roster

 Engine No. 3, an Alco RS3, was built in 1955 and was used by the MAA for 44 years before being sold in 1999 to the Blacklands Railroad in Sulfur Springs, Texas, and then sold again in 2004 to the Oklahoma Railway Museum for static display. In 2018, it was purchased by the Arizona State Railroad Museum foundation, who moved it to Williams, Arizona, and it is temporarily stored at the Grand Canyon Railway's yard, until the ASRM's own building finishes construction.
After Retirement in 1968, it was later sold to the Oregon Pacific & Eastern Railroad. It's now on display at the Galveston Railroad Museum in Galveston, Texas. The locomotive also had a few movie roles in Bearcats!, 1971 and Emperor of the North Pole, 1973.
 Engine No. 6 is a Baldwin Locomotive Works  built in October 1907 and operated until 1960.  It is now on display at the McCormick-Stillman Railroad Park in Scottsdale, Arizona.
 Engine No. 7, a Baldwin , was built in 1917 for the Tremont and Gulf Railroad, who sold it to Magma in 1954.  It was featured in the popular epic film How the West Was Won.  The engine was purchased by the Texas State Railroad in 1974 and rehabbed in 1978.
 Engine No. 8, a Baldwin S-8, was originally built for the Medford Corporation in 1952.  After Medford suspended railroad logging operations in 1961, the locomotive was sold to Magma Arizona in 1968.  Its generator failed in September 1992 and was sold to The Southern Oregon Chapter of the National Railway Historical Society, who rehabbed it for use on the Central Oregon and Pacific Railroad. It is the only Baldwin switcher built with dynamic braking.
 Engine No 9, a Baldwin S-12, was built for the McCloud River Railroad in October of 1953. It was numbered No. 31. It was purchased by Magma in 1969. It is currently stored in Superior, Arizona, where it is out of service.
 Engine No. 10, a Baldwin DRS-6-6-1500 was built in 1950 for the McCloud River Railroad as their No. 29.  It was purchased in 1969 by Magma and renumbered to Engine No. 10 and operated on the Magma line from January, 1970–1991. In 1994, it was donated to the Arizona Railway Museum in Chandler, Arizona, where it is largely functional.

References

Bibliography 
Chappell, Gordon. Rails to Carry Copper: A History of the Magma Arizona Railroad. Boulder, Colorado; Pruett Publishing Company, 1973. Includes over 200 photographs, maps, and scale drawings.

External links

 History of the Magma Railroad
 Images of Magma Arizona Railroad engines
 Resolution Copper

Defunct Arizona railroads
3 ft gauge railways in the United States
Narrow gauge railroads in Arizona